Ovens are thermally insulated chambers used for cooking.

Ovens may also refer to:

Places

Australia 
 Ovens River, a river in Victoria, Australia, named after explorer John Ovens
 Ovens, Victoria, a town located on the river
 Ovens railway station, a closed station
 Electoral district of Ovens, the town's former electoral district
 Electoral district of Ovens Valley, the town's current electoral district
 Ovens and Murray, a region encompassing the district

Elsewhere 
 Ovens, County Cork, a village in Ireland
 Ovens Auditorium, an auditorium in Charlotte, North Carolina

People
 Denis Ovens (born 1957), English darts player
 Gilbert Ovens (1884 or 1885 to 1963), English footballer
 John Ovens (1788–1825), Australian civil engineer and explorer
 Jürgen Ovens (1623–1678), Frisian painter

Ships
 HMAS Ovens, an Oberon-class submarine of the Royal Australian Navy, named after John Ovens